Anarchitektur is the first release of Einstürzende Neubauten's Musterhaus project, a series of highly experimental CD releases that were only available via an annual subscription through their website or from shows during their 25th Anniversary Tour. This project was separate from their Neubauten.org Supporter Project, which it ran concurrent to.

Unlike later releases in the Musterhaus series, Anarchitektur did not have a specific theme to it. Rather, it was general experimentation described on the back of the album as "an outlet to the creative aspects of the band that are more experimental, challenging, and less likely to fit into song/album format of their regular releases", a concept which would continue on through the series as the foundation for each release.

Track listing
 "Anarchitektur" – 46:00

Notes
Personnel:
Arbeit / Bargeld / Chudy / Hacke / Moser

 JA: electric guitar, e-bow, electronic guitar treatments, choir
 BB: electric guitar, balinese gong, polyester fabrics, door, voice, choir
 NU: electronic hums, blow-torch pipes, yangqin, field recordings, logs, choir
 AH: electric bass guitar, electronics, choir
 RM: electronic percussion treatments, yangqin, bowed jet turbine, bowed radiator grill, metal sheet, kick drum, big drum, choir

Recorded 09-27-04 and 03-04-05 at The Bunker, Berlin by Boris Wilsdorf
Mixed by Boris Wilsdorf and EN using a random number generator
Assisted by Marco Paschke
Produced by Einstürzende Neubauten

External links 
 https://web.archive.org/web/20050327070931/http://musterhaus.neubauten.org/

Einstürzende Neubauten albums
2005 albums